Acrolophus mortipennella is a moth of the family Acrolophidae. It was described by Augustus Radcliffe Grote in 1872. It is found in North America, including Alabama, Florida, Illinois, Kentucky, Louisiana, Mississippi, Ohio, South Carolina and
Texas.

The wingspan is 23–30 mm.

References

Moths described in 1872
mortipennella